"Lil L.O.V.E." is a song by hip hop group Bone Thugs-n-Harmony for their studio album Strength & Loyalty (2007). It features American singer Mariah Carey and rapper Bow Wow and was released as the second single from the album in 2007. The artists co-wrote the song with Shante Harris, James Phillips, and Jermaine Dupri; the latter is also the producer. In the chorus, Carey expresses her need for a 'Lil L.O.V.E' and 'T.I.M.E' from her suspected lover. In the United States, "Lil’ L.O.V.E." was released as a digital download on May 8, 2007. The song was officially released as a single in the U.S. on June 5, 2007.

Reviews
"Lil L.O.V.E." has received very positive reviews from important industrial magazines and websites.

Cinema Blend expresses, "Mariah Carey and Bow Wow join the cause for "Lil L.O.V.E." Mariah reveals she's still plenty relevant and is not vanishing anytime soon. Bow Wow sounds pleased with himself in the song's background, so good for him."

According to Billboard, “…  “Lil L.O.V.E.," featuring a melodious and round duet with Mariah Carey, is their 2007 version of the 1998 hit "Breakdown" …"

Additionally, SoundBytes - News4Jax praises Carey, calling her the main focus of the song. "The group can also show a softer side without stooping to syrupy-ness. Mariah Carey's sensual crooning is the first voice you hear on "Lil L.O.V.E." and before listeners know it, they're hooked and drawn into the midst of a seductive club jam. Dupri, who specializes in such designer dance floor material, helms the song's dense, layered keyboard noodling and synthetic bass pattern that while completely formulaic, could've been a contender on the R&B charts if Carey was its sole focus. Instead, the song's potential is blocked by the Thugs' and Bow Wow's loquaciousness on the mic."

Music video
The video was directed by Chris Robinson who last directed Carey in the video for her single "I Know What You Want" with Busta Rhymes.

In the video are guest appearance of Swizz Beatz and Jermaine Dupri.

The video premiered in BET's 106 & Park on July 5, 2007.

Charts

References

2007 singles
Bone Thugs-n-Harmony songs
Mariah Carey songs
Bow Wow (rapper) songs
Music videos directed by Chris Robinson (director)
Songs written by Mariah Carey
Songs written by Jermaine Dupri
Songs written by Layzie Bone
Songs written by Wish Bone
Songs written by Krayzie Bone
Song recordings produced by Jermaine Dupri
2007 songs
Interscope Records singles